The Journal of Trace Elements in Medicine and Biology is a bimonthly peer-reviewed medical journal covering the roles played by trace elements in medical and biological systems. It was established in 1987 as the Journal of Trace Elements and Electrolytes in Health and Disease, obtaining its current title in 1995. It is published by Elsevier on behalf of the Federation of European Societies on Trace Elements and Minerals (FESTEM), of which it is the official journal. The editor-in-chief is Dirk Schaumlöffel (Université de Pau et des Pays de l'Adour/Centre national de la recherche scientifique). According to the Journal Citation Reports, the journal has a 2017 impact factor of 3.755.

References

External links

Biochemistry journals
Medicinal chemistry journals
Quarterly journals
Publications established in 1987
Elsevier academic journals
English-language journals
Inorganic chemistry journals